Francisco de Manso Zuñiga y Sola (1587 – December 27, 1655) was a Spanish Catholic prelate who served as Archbishop of Burgos (1640–1655), Archbishop (Personal Title) of Cartagena (1637–1640), and as Archbishop of Mexico (1627–1634).

Biography
Francisco de Manso Zuñiga y Sola was born in Cañas, La Rioja, Spain. On August 9, 1627, he was selected by the King of Spain and confirmed by Pope Urban VIII as Archbishop of Mexico. April 12, 1628, he was consecrated bishop by Alonso Orozco Enriquez de Armendáriz Castellanos y Toledo, Bishop of Michoacán. He served as Archbishop of Mexico until his resignation on July 20, 1634. On October 5, 1637, he was selected by the King of Spain and confirmed by Pope Urban VIII as Archbishop (Personal Title) of Cartagena. On October 8, 1640, he was selected by the King of Spain and confirmed by Pope Urban VIII as Archbishop of Burgos where he served until his death on December 27, 1655.

While bishop, he was the principal consecrator of Juan Velasco Acevedo, Bishop of Orense (1637); Pedro Luis Manso Zuñiga, Auxiliary Bishop of Burgos (1648); and Juan Bravo Lasprilla, Bishop of Lugo (1652).

References

External links and additional sources
 (for Chronology of Bishops)
 (for Chronology of Bishops)
 (for Chronology of Bishops) 
 (for Chronology of Bishops) 
 (for Chronology of Bishops) 
 (for Chronology of Bishops) 

1587 births
1655 deaths
17th-century Roman Catholic archbishops in Mexico
Roman Catholic archbishops of Mexico (city)
Spanish Roman Catholic bishops in North America
Bishops of Burgos
Bishops appointed by Pope Urban VIII
17th-century Roman Catholic archbishops in Spain